In the mathematical subject of group theory, the Hanna Neumann conjecture is a statement about the rank of the intersection of two finitely generated subgroups of a free group. The conjecture was posed by Hanna Neumann in 1957.
In 2011, a strengthened version of the conjecture (see below) was proved independently by Joel Friedman
and by Igor Mineyev.

In 2017, a third proof of the  Strengthened Hanna Neumann conjecture, based on homological arguments inspired by pro-p-group considerations, was published by Andrei Jaikin-Zapirain.

History

The subject of the conjecture was originally motivated by a 1954 theorem of Howson who proved that the intersection of any two finitely generated subgroups of a free group is always finitely generated, that is, has finite rank. In this paper Howson proved that if H and K are subgroups of a free group F(X) of finite ranks n ≥ 1 and m ≥ 1 then the rank s of H ∩ K satisfies:
s − 1 ≤ 2mn − m − n.

In a 1956 paper Hanna Neumann improved this bound by showing that :

s − 1 ≤ 2mn − 2m − n.

In a 1957 addendum, Hanna Neumann further improved this bound to show that under the above assumptions

s − 1 ≤ 2(m − 1)(n − 1).

She also conjectured that the factor of 2 in the above inequality is not necessary and that one always has

s − 1 ≤ (m − 1)(n − 1).

This statement became known as the Hanna Neumann conjecture.

Formal statement

Let H, K  ≤ F(X) be two nontrivial finitely generated subgroups of a free group F(X) and let L = H ∩ K be the intersection of H and K.  The conjecture says that in this case

rank(L) − 1 ≤ (rank(H) − 1)(rank(K) − 1).

Here for a group G the quantity rank(G) is the rank of G, that is, the smallest size of a generating set for G.
Every subgroup of a free group is known to be free itself and the rank of a free group is equal to the size of any free basis of that free group.

Strengthened Hanna Neumann conjecture

If H, K  ≤ G are two subgroups of a group G and if a, b ∈ G define the same double coset HaK = HbK then the subgroups H ∩ aKa−1 and H ∩ bKb−1 are conjugate in G and thus have the same rank. It is known that if H, K  ≤ F(X) are finitely generated subgroups of a finitely generated free group F(X) then there exist at most finitely many double coset classes HaK in F(X) such that H ∩ aKa−1 ≠ {1}. Suppose that at least one such double coset exists and let a1,...,an be all the distinct representatives of such double cosets. The strengthened Hanna Neumann conjecture, formulated by her son Walter Neumann (1990), states that in this situation

The strengthened Hanna Neumann conjecture was proved in 2011 by Joel Friedman.
Shortly after, another proof was given by Igor Mineyev.

Partial results and other generalizations

In 1971 Burns improved Hanna Neumann's 1957 bound and proved that under the same assumptions as in Hanna Neumann's paper one has

s ≤ 2mn − 3m − 2n + 4.

In a 1990 paper, Walter Neumann formulated the strengthened Hanna Neumann conjecture (see statement above).
Tardos (1992) established the strengthened Hanna Neumann Conjecture for the case where at least one of the subgroups H and K of F(X) has rank two. As most other approaches to the Hanna Neumann conjecture, Tardos used the technique of Stallings subgroup graphs for analyzing subgroups of free groups and their intersections.  
Warren Dicks (1994) established the equivalence of the strengthened Hanna Neumann conjecture and a graph-theoretic statement that he called the amalgamated graph conjecture.
In 2001 Dicks and Formanek established the strengthened Hanna Neumann conjecture for the case where at least one of the subgroups H and K of F(X) has rank at most three.
Khan (2002) and, independently, Meakin and Weil (2002), showed that the conclusion of the strengthened Hanna Neumann conjecture holds if one of the subgroups H, K of F(X) is positively generated, that is, generated by a finite set of words that involve only elements of X but not of X−1 as letters.
Ivanov and Dicks and Ivanov obtained analogs and generalizations of Hanna Neumann's results for the intersection of subgroups H and K of a free product of several groups.
Wise (2005) claimed that the strengthened Hanna Neumann conjecture implies another long-standing group-theoretic conjecture which says that every one-relator group with torsion is coherent (that is, every finitely generated subgroup in such a group is finitely presented).

See also
Geometric group theory

References

Group theory
Geometric group theory
Conjectures that have been proved